Zobar (also Romanized as Zobār and Zebar; also known as Zāwar) is a village in Nayband Rural District, Chah-e Mobarak District, Asaluyeh County, Bushehr Province, Iran. At the 2006 census, its population was 810, in 122 families.

References 

Populated places in Asaluyeh County